Christophe Grudler (born 9 April 1965) is a French politician and a journalist who has been serving as a Member of the European Parliament since the 2019 elections.

Political career
Grudler has since been serving on the Committee on Industry, Research and Energy, on the Committee on Foreign Affairs, and the Subcommittee on Security and Defence.

In addition to his committee assignments, Grudler is part of the Parliament's delegation for Northern cooperation and for relations with Switzerland and Norway and to the EU-Iceland Joint Parliamentary Committee and the European Economic Area (EEA) Joint Parliamentary Committee. He is a member of the European Parliament Intergroup on Artificial Intelligence and Digital, the European Parliament Intergroup on Children’s Rights, the European Parliament Intergroup on Climate Change, Biodiversity and Sustainable Development, the European Parliament Intergroup on Fighting against Poverty, the European Parliament Intergroup on the Welfare and Conservation of Animals and the Spinelli Group.

Political positions
In May 2021, Grudler joined a group of 39 mostly Green Party lawmakers from the European Parliament who in a letter urged the leaders of Germany, France and Italy not to support Arctic LNG 2, a $21 billion Russian Arctic liquefied natural gas (LNG) project, due to climate change concerns.

References

External links 

 Christophe Grudler's page on the VoteWatch website
 Personal profile of Christophe Grudler in the European Parliament's database of members

1965 births
Living people
MEPs for France 2019–2024
Democratic Movement (France) MEPs
Democratic Movement (France) politicians
French people of German descent
Politicians  from Belfort
Politicians from Grand Est
University of Strasbourg alumni
20th-century French historians
21st-century French historians
Writers from Belfort